High Point Town Center is a lifestyle center located in Prattville, Alabama, United States, across from the Prattville Towne Center. The  mall opened in 2008 but remained largely vacant leading to its sale at a bankruptcy auction in July 2011.

Anchor tenants
 Belk
 JCPenney
 Publix

References

Further reading

Shopping malls in Alabama
Shopping malls established in 2008
Prattville, Alabama
Buildings and structures in Autauga County, Alabama